Vestereng is a nature site in the environs of northern Aarhus and the suburb of Skejby. The name literally translates as 'westward meadow'. The Municipality of Aarhus took ownership in 1939.

The area has a lively history of recent times and is now used extensively by several civil groups and organizations. The most prevalent groups as of 2013, being Aarhus Beach Volley Club, the roleplaying club Einherjerne, Aarhus Dirt Jump Park and Aarhus civil dog handling Association.

History

Vestereng was used by the German occupational forces as ammunition storage for the Kriegsmarine during the Second World War. They constructed a total of 14 concrete bunkers; 10 as storage facilities and 4 for machinegun defence and the bunkers are still here today, as a historical testimony to the occupation. After the liberation in 1945, the Danish military forces took over and Vestereng was used as a shooting range and training ground for several decades. From 1978-87 the Danish Home Guard took over the military practice on Vestereng.

Music 
Up until 2013, Vestereng was used as a venue for large outdoor concerts, but this activity has been discontinued due to the newly expanded Aarhus University Hospital in Skejby close by and inaccessibility to emergency and firefighting units.

The Aarhus leg of the annual Danish Muscular Dystrophy Association benefit concert tour, Grøn Koncert (Green Concert), was held in Vestereng since 1987 along with other large popular music concerts. Over the years, Vestereng has hosted big outdoor concerts with many popular Danish and several internationally acclaimed bands such as Medina, Kashmir, Nephew, Magtens Korridorer and Simple Minds, The Police, D-A-D, Metallica, etc. to name a few.

Nature
The nature of Vestereng comprise meadows, scattered vegetation and a woodland area. There are a number of smaller ponds here and a stream is running through the area to join the larger Egå, a few kilometres north of here. The meadows are very popular with moles apparently, as evidenced by the many molehills. Hawthorns is the most common tree at Vestereng and they also forms a peculiar habitat of hawthorn-forest.

Despite the relatively high level of activity, Vestereng supports a rich flora and fauna, with some species rare or almost rare to Denmark even. These are primarily insects and organisms depending on a wet environment. Roe deer can sometimes be seen here, as they roam the area of Vestereng and Brendstrup Skov further east. They are to be protected.

Gallery 
Hawthorn

Nature and landscape

References

Sources
 Vestereng ULF i Aarhus, Aarhus Municipality 
 Vestereng Arrangør i Aarhus, Aarhus Municipality 
 Vestereng Aarhus Akademi 
 Thorkild Steenberg: Vestereng educational pamphlet (biology), Aarhus Akademi

External links

 Map of Vestereng

Aarhus N
Geography of Aarhus
Military installations of Denmark
Military installations closed in 1987
Former music venues in Denmark